A number of steamships have carried the name Badenia, including:

, a cargo liner in service 1902–1921
, a coaster in service 1912–1939

Ship names